Deeghuparwar is a village in Deegh mandal in Sant Ravidas Nagar District in Uttar Pradesh State in India. Deegh Uparwar is 31.9 km from its District Main City Gyanpur and 215 km from its State Main City Lucknow.

The locally famous Katara Market is situated in this village.

Demographics 

As of 2001 India census, Deegh Uparwar had a population of 9029. Males constitute 52% (4672) of the population and females 48% (4357).

References 

Villages in Bhadohi district